Kim Hyun-soo (born June 23, 2000) is a South Korean actress. She often starred as the younger version of female protagonist in television series such as Bridal Mask and My Love from the Star, before receiving her first leading role in Solomon's Perjury. Kim's most notable on-screen role so far was Bae Ro-na from The Penthouse: War in Life (2020–2021).

Career
Kim Hyun-soo started to work in the entertainment industry as a child model. She debuted as an actress through 2011 film Silenced, in which her role as a deaf student who suffered abuse landed her the nomination for Best Supporting Actress at the 49th Grand Bell Awards. Kim then starred as the younger version of female protagonist in several hit series, notably Deep Rooted Tree, Bridal Mask and My Love from the Star. She played her first regular role in TV series with Gunman in Joseon.

In 2016, she acted alongside Kim Hye-soo in the well-received dramedy film Familyhood, as a high school girl who got caught up in teenage pregnancy. Later that year, Kim has been cast as the protagonist for the first time in JTBC's youth mystery drama, Solomon's Perjury.

Kim costarred with Jang Hyuk for the 2020 historical action film, The Swordsman. In the same year, she was cast in SBS melodrama suspense The Penthouse: War in Life, in which her role as a girl who strives to be top soprano singer amidst many obstacles, got her nominated for Best New Actress at the most prestigious TV Awards in South Korea, 57th Baeksang Arts Awards.

On April 25, 2022, Kim signed with Andmarq.

Filmography

Film

Television series

Web series

Television show

Music video appearances

Awards and nominations

References

External links

 
 
 

2000 births
Living people
21st-century South Korean actresses
South Korean television actresses
South Korean film actresses
South Korean child actresses
People from Gyeonggi Province